Perspectives on Politics is a quarterly peer-reviewed academic journal covering political science. It was established in 2003 and is published by Cambridge University Press on behalf of the American Political Science Association. The editor-in-chief is Michael Bernhard (University of Florida) and the associate/book review editor is Daniel I. O'Neill (University of Florida); the founding editor was Jennifer Hochschild.

Abstracting and indexing 
The journal is abstracted and indexed in the Social Sciences Citation Index and Current Contents/Social & Behavioral Sciences. According to the Journal Citation Reports, the journal has a 2016 impact factor of 3.234, ranking it 8th out of 165 journals in the category "Political Science".

See also 
 List of political science journals

References

External links 
 

Political science journals
Publications established in 2003
Cambridge University Press academic journals
English-language journals
Quarterly journals
Academic journals associated with learned and professional societies